Luke Perry (1966–2019) was an American actor.

Luke Perry may also refer to:

 Luke Perry (artist) (born 1983), English artist
 Luke Perry (volleyball) (born 1995), Australian volleyball player

See also
 
 Luke Berry (born 1992), an English professional footballer